The Cast of Cheers are a four-piece indie/math rock band from Sligo and Dublin, Ireland composed of Conor Adams (vocals, guitar), Neil Adams (guitar, vocals), John Higgins (bass, vocals) and Kevin Curran (drums).

History (2009 - present)
The Cast of Cheers were formed in 2009 in Dublin, Ireland, by lead vocalist Conor Adams and bassist John Higgins, who recruited Kevin Curran on drums and, after the recording of their début album, they asked Conor's brother, Neil Adams, to play guitar live. They released their first album Chariot in February 2010 on bandcamp.com for free. It received over 150,000 downloads and netted them a nomination at the Choice Music Awards. Their second album, Family, was produced by Luke Smith, ex of Clor and was released on 20 July 2012 through Schoolboy Error/Co-Operative Music, and debuted at number 37 on the Irish Album Charts.

To date they have supported Blood Red Shoes, Howler, Bloc Party, Alt-J, Two Door Cinema Club and Bombay Bicycle Club.

Members
 Conor Adams – Lead vocals, guitar
 Neil Adams – Lead guitar, vocals
 John Higgins – Bass, vocals
 Kevin Curran - Drums, percussion

Discography

Albums

Singles

Awards

Choice Music Prize
The Cast of Cheers debut album, Chariot, was nominated for the Choice Music Prize in January 2010.

|-
| 2010 || Chariot || Irish Album of the Year 2010 || 
|-

References

External links
 

2009 establishments in Ireland
Irish alternative rock groups
Irish indie rock groups
Math rock groups
Musicians from County Sligo
Musical groups from Dublin (city)
Musical groups established in 2009
Musical quartets